Yavanna is a fictional character in the works of author J. R. R. Tolkien.

Yavanna may also refer to:
Yavanna (proturan), a genus of arthropod animals
Yavanna (plant), an extinct genus of tree fern

See also
Yavana